Burtonops is a genus of trilobites in the order Phacopida. It was described by Struve in 1990.

Species
 Burtonops cristata (Hall, 1861)
 Burtonops gaspensis (Clarke 1908)
 Burtonops stummi (Eldredge 1973)
 Burtonops variabilis (Eldredge 1973)
 Burtonops nasutus (Stumm, 1954)

References

External links
 Burtonops at the Paleobiology Database

Phacopidae
Phacopida genera
Fossil taxa described in 1990
Devonian trilobites